Hamilton Dhlamini (born 15 December 1969), sometimes as Hamilton Dlamini, is a South African actor, playwright and a filmmaker. He is best known for the roles in the films and teleserials Isithembiso, Faith like Potatoes and The King's Messenger .

Personal life
He was born on 15 December 1969 in a township South of Johannesburg, called Sebokeng, Vaal Triangle, South Africa to a family with poor economy.

He is married to a nutritionist, Martha, where they have three children. He first met Martha in a lift.

Career
He started his acting career in early 1984 through stage plays. He also played as a businessman Korea in the SABC 1 sitcom Mzee Wa Two Six. In early 2008, he made a lead role in the short series on SABC1, adapted by William Shakespeare’s play King Lear. Also, he played a lead character on the SABC 2 sitcom Stokvel with the role 'Mojo Khumalo'. In 2008, he acted in the series Ten Bush directed by Mncedisi Shabangu. For his role, he later won the Naledi Theatre Award for the best supporting actor. Then in 2009, he collaborated with William Kentridge and the Handspring Puppet Company on Woyzeck in the Highveld.

In 2006, he acted in Regardt van den Bergh’s film Faith like Potatoes. This time, he won a South African Film and Television Awards (Safta) for best supporting actor for his role. In 2007, he won the Golden Horn Award for Best Supporting Actor in a Feature Film. In 2018, he played the role 'Banzi Motaung' in the popular television series Isithembiso. In the same year, he again won the Golden Horn Award for Best Actor in a TV soap opera 'Isithembiso'.

In 2018, he starred in the play 'Woza Albert' with Joburg City Theatres which was staged at The Kenya International Theatre Festival. His outstanding performance and the general impact of 'Woza Albert' in the festival attribute to his celebration as the most outstanding act of the previous year in the 2019 edition of The Kenya International Theatre Festival. He appeared in the official #KITFest2019 poster.

He also founded his own production company, 'Ndlondlo Productions'.

Filmography

Other Television roles
 Askies!, Season 1 as Homeless Man
 Boo & TT, Season 1 as TT 
 City Ses'la, Season 1 as Uncle Mto eKasi
 Our Stories, Season 5 as Mbangiseni 
 Fluiters, Season 1 as Bantu Ntenga 
 Home Affairs, Season 2 as Katleho's Father 
 Home Affairs, Season 3 & 4 as Senzo Mbatha 
 Izingane zoBaba, Season 1 as Lucky 
 Mutual Friends (2014), Season 1 as Pat 
 Mzansi, Season 1 & 2 as Prosper 
 Mzee wa Two Six, Season 1 as Korea 
 Saints and Sinners, Season 2 as Andries 
 Shooting Stars, Season 2 as Themba Zwane 
 Soul Buddyz, Season 1 as Melusi's Teacher
 Stokvel, Season 6 as Mojo Khumalo 
 The Mayor, Season 1 as Mapula 
 Matlala Umlilo, Season 1, 2, 3 & 4 as Mnqobi Simelane 
 Zero Tolerance, Season 1 as Lefty 
 Zero Tolerance, Season 3 as President Tubman

See also
 2018 DStv Mzansi Viewers' Choice Awards
 List of South African films

References

External links
 

Living people
20th-century South African male actors
South African male film actors
1969 births
South African male stage actors
South African male television actors
People from Sebokeng
South African dramatists and playwrights
21st-century South African male actors